Thomas Holzer (born 27 December 1985) is a German racing driver.

Career

Formula BMW
Born in Augsburg, Holzer began his karting career in 1997, before moving into the Formula BMW ADAC championship in 2001, with ADAC e.V. Motorsport. Holzer finished seventh in the championship. He switched teams and went to the main class, joining Mücke Motorsport for 2002 and finished the season on the sixth place with two wins at EuroSpeedway Lausitz.

Formula Three
Holzer graduated to the Formula 3 class in 2003, joining the German Formula Three Championship and Trella Motorsport. He finished seventh with one podium. He stayed in the series for the next year, but switched to his family team AM-Holzer Rennsport. He improved to fifth place in the standings and won race at EuroSpeedway Lausitz.

In 2005, Holzer moved to the Formula 3 Euro Series. He finished 22nd in the standings without scoring a point.

ADAC GT Masters
After six-year absence Holzer returned in racing, participating in local series ADAC GT Masters with Heico Motorsport.

FIA World Endurance Championship
In 2012 Holzer moved to the endurance racing, joining FIA World Endurance Championship and Lotus. He continued his LMP2 campaign with Lotus-backed Kodewa in 2013.

Racing record

Career summary

 Season still in progress.

Complete Formula 3 Euro Series results
(key) (Races in bold indicate pole position) (Races in italics indicate fastest lap)

Complete FIA World Endurance Championship results

24 Hours of Le Mans results

References

External links
 
 

1985 births
Living people
Sportspeople from Augsburg
German racing drivers
Formula BMW ADAC drivers
German Formula Three Championship drivers
Formula 3 Euro Series drivers
24 Hours of Le Mans drivers
FIA World Endurance Championship drivers
European Le Mans Series drivers
ADAC GT Masters drivers
Kolles Racing drivers
Mücke Motorsport drivers
Boutsen Ginion Racing drivers